Girolamo Lombardo, also Girolamo Lombardi (1506–1590), was an Italian sculptor.

Lombardo was born in Ferrara, the son of the architect and sculptor Antonio Lombardo, and also was the brother of Lodovico and Aurelio, also sculptors. He studied and began in his father's workshop in Ferrara, then subsequently traveled to Venice to continue training with Jacopo Sansovino, with which, between 1532 and 1540, he worked in the Biblioteca Marciana in the Loggia of the bell tower of Saint Mark's in Venice.

Lombardo is documented in Loreto, Marche since 1543, where for some years he was active with his brother Aurelio and where they were in 1550 also reached the third brother, Lodovico. Around 1552 he moved with his brothers and opened their own foundry and workshop in Recanati, passing the Venetian mature technique to all operators of the workshop. The school sculptural continued in subsequent generations with Tiburzio Vergelli, Antonio Calcagni, Sebastiano Sebastiani, Tarquinio Jacometti and Pier Paolo Jacometti.

His sons Anthony, Peter and Paul, also became sculptors and bronze founders.

References
 Vitalini Giuseppe Sacconi, Macerata and its territory: Sculpture.
 Peter Zampetti, Sculpture in the Marche, edited by Nardini Editore.
 Ugo Donati, A Brief History of the artists Ticino, Bellinzona, 1936, 68; Idem, Ticino Artists in Venice from the fifteenth to the seventeenth century, the Bank of Rome to Switzerland, Lugano, 1961, 27.
 Massimo Ambrosetti, The Lombardo-Solari outside Venice, in LaCittà, Lugano December 2008 47.

1506 births
1590 deaths
16th-century Italian sculptors
Italian male sculptors
Artists from Ferrara